"The Way It Is" is a song by American glam metal band Tesla. When it was released as a single in March of 1990 it peaked at number 55 on the Hot 100, and 13 on the Album Rock Tracks chart.

Reception
In his review of The Great Radio Controversy, Steve Huey, writing for AllMusic, called this song along with Love Song and Heaven's Trail, "among their best, with melodies and riffs that aren't predictable, cookie-cutter product".

Charts

References

1990 singles
1989 songs
Tesla (band) songs
Geffen Records singles
Southern rock songs